Gilberto Manuel Pereira da Silva (born 26 March 1987 in Guimarães, Minho Province) is a Portuguese professional footballer who plays for S.C. Covilhã mainly as a central midfielder but also as a right back.

References

External links

1987 births
Living people
Sportspeople from Guimarães
Portuguese footballers
Association football defenders
Association football midfielders
Association football utility players
Primeira Liga players
Liga Portugal 2 players
Segunda Divisão players
Boavista F.C. players
S.C. Covilhã players
Cypriot First Division players
Ermis Aradippou FC players
Portugal youth international footballers
Portugal under-21 international footballers
Portuguese expatriate footballers
Expatriate footballers in Cyprus
Portuguese expatriate sportspeople in Cyprus